Jarusan (also Romanized as Jārusān) is a village in Kakavand-e Gharbi Rural District, Kakavand District, Delfan County, Lorestan Province, Iran. At the 2006 census, its population was 77, in 15 families.

References 

Towns and villages in Delfan County